Marcel Cuypers (born 8 May 1880, date of death unknown) was a Belgian fencer. He competed at the 1920 and 1928 Summer Olympics.

References

1880 births
Year of death missing
Belgian male fencers
Belgian foil fencers
Olympic fencers of Belgium
Fencers at the 1920 Summer Olympics
Fencers at the 1928 Summer Olympics